Parker Field is a 2,500-seat baseball stadium in the northwest United States, located in Yakima, Washington. Opened  in 1937 for the Yakima Pippins of the Western International League, it hosted various professional and amateur teams in the area prior to the opening of Yakima County Stadium in 1993. 

The stadium is adjacent to Yakima Valley Community College and hosted the American Legion World Series in 1954, 1978, and 2001. The Yakima Beetles, the American Legion team based at Parker Field, won national titles in 1953, 1975, and 1979.

Parker grew up in Yakima, was a quarterback at the University of Washington in Seattle, organized the Western International League, and established the Yakima Pippins baseball club.
 
A fire in March 1962 destroyed the wooden grandstand, which was quickly rebuilt.

It has an unorthodox orientation, aligned southeast (home plate to center field); recommended alignment is east-northeast. It was formerly aligned to the northeast.

References

External links
Yakima Valley Tourism - sports venues
Parker Youth & Sports Foundation
Yakima Valley Community College Athletics - Yaks baseball
Yakima Beetles - American Legion baseball

Minor league baseball venues
Sports venues in Washington (state)
Buildings and structures in Yakima, Washington
1937 establishments in Washington (state)
Sports venues completed in 1937
Baseball venues in Washington (state)